Marner is an English and German surname. Notable people with the surname include:

 Mitch Marner (born 1997), Canadian hockey player
 Peter Marner (1936–2007), English cricketer
 Richard Marner (1921–2004, born as Alexander Pavlovich Molchanov), Russian-born British actor

See also
 Silas Marner, 1861 dramatic novel by George Eliot

English-language surnames
German-language surnames